Colbourn is a surname. Notable people with the surname include:

Charles Colbourn (born 1953), Canadian computer scientist and mathematician
Trevor Colbourn (1927–2015), Australian academic and President of the University of Central Florida

See also
Colburn (disambiguation)